Orlando Luz and Rafael Matos were the defending champions but only Matos chose to defend his title, partnering João Menezes. Matos withdrew from the tournament before his quarterfinal match.

Sadio Doumbia and Fabien Reboul won the title after defeating Luis David Martínez and Felipe Meligeni Alves 6–7(7–9), 7–5, [10–7] in the final.

Seeds

Draw

References

External links
 Main draw

Campeonato Internacional de Tênis de Campinas - Doubles
2020 Doubles